Roger Loveless is an American fantasy artist whose work has appeared in role-playing games.

Career
Loveless graduated from Utah State University, then moved to Los Angeles to begin a freelance career in illustration. He has worked for clients from the entertainment industry, publishing, and advertising, including Milton Bradley, Nickelodeon, and Paramount Studios. He has created packaging illustrations for some Super NES and Genesis games and for G.I. Joe products. His Dungeons & Dragons work includes Vale of the Mage (1989), Legends & Lore (1990), Castles (1990), Tome of Magic (1991), Slayers of Lankhmar (1992), Cities of Bone (1994), Player's Option: Combat & Tactics (1995), and Warlock of the Stonecrowns (1995).

Loveless is also known for his inspirational images of Jesus Christ.

References

External links
 Roger Loveless's website
 

Artists from Los Angeles
Living people
Place of birth missing (living people)
Role-playing game artists
Utah State University alumni
Year of birth missing (living people)